Gerard van Spaendonck (22 March 1746 – 11 May 1822) was a Dutch painter.

Life
Gerard was born in Tilburg, an older brother of Cornelis van Spaendonck (1756–1840), who was also an accomplished artist. In the 1760s he studied with decorative painter Willem Jacob Herreyns (also known as Guillaume-Jacques Herreyns) (1743–1827) in Antwerp. In 1769 he moved to Paris, where in 1774 he was appointed miniature painter in the court of Louis XVI. In 1780 he succeeded Madeleine Françoise Basseporte (1701–1780) as professor of floral painting at the Jardin des Plantes, and shortly afterwards was elected as a member of the Académie des beaux-arts. Among his pupils were Pierre-Joseph Redouté and Henriette Vincent.

Gerard van Spaendonck painted with both oil and watercolors. He contributed over fifty works to Les Vélins du Roi, a famous collection of botanical watercolors possessed by French royalty. From 1799 to 1801 he published twenty-four plates of Fleurs Dessinees d'apres Nature (Flowers Drawn from Life), which were high-quality engravings for students of floral painting. Today, Spaendonck's Fleurs Dessinées d'après Nature is a highly treasured book on floral art.

In 1788 he was appointed adviser to the Académie, and in 1795 became a founding member of the Institut de France. In 1804 he received the Légion d'honneur and soon afterwards was ennobled by Napoleon Bonaparte.

Spaendonck died in Paris in 1822 and is buried in the Père Lachaise Cemetery.

Gallery

References 
 Arader Galleries Gerard van Spaendonck biography

External links

Dutch male painters
1746 births
1822 deaths
People from Tilburg
Burials at Père Lachaise Cemetery
Members of the Académie des beaux-arts
18th-century Dutch painters
18th-century Dutch male artists
19th-century Dutch painters
Flower artists
Recipients of the Legion of Honour
19th-century Dutch male artists